AS ADEMA is a Malagasy football club based in Antananarivo, Madagascar. They have won the THB Champions League championship on three occasions, in 2002, 2006 and 2012. In 2002 they also advanced to the quarterfinals of the CAF Cup before losing to Al-Masry of Egypt.
AS ADEMA won a THB Champions League match against SO l'Emyrne by the score of 149–0 on 31 October 2002.  SOE scored 149 own goals in protest of a refereeing decision.

Achievements

THB Champions League: 4
2002, 2006, 2012, 2021

Coupe de Madagascar: 3
2007, 2008, 2009

Super Coupe de Madagascar: 2
2006, 2008

Performance in CAF competitions
CAF Champions League: 2 appearances
2003 – Preliminary Round
2007 – First Round

CAF Confederation Cup: 4 appearances
2008 – Preliminary Round
2009 – Preliminary Round
2010 – Preliminary Round
2011 – First Round of 16

CAF Cup: 1 appearance
2002 – Quarter-Finals

Current squad

References

Football clubs in Madagascar